

Phone number formats
Telephone numbers in Peru are made of:

Mobile telephony
 Nine digits for mobile numbers across the country. The first digit is always the number nine.

Fixed (land) lines
 Seven digits in the Metropolitan Area of Lima and Callao
 Six digits in the rest of the country

Area codes
Peruvian area codes for each region (national subdivision) are 2 digits long except for Lima and Callao. On 1 March 2003 new codes were established.

The following is a list of the area codes in Peru:

Mobile phone calls within Peru (Mobile Virtual Area)
From September 4, 2010, a national Mobile Virtual Area  was created meaning that all mobile numbers in Peru are non-geographical (not attached to any geographical region but instead to the new MVA). In addition to that all mobile numbers across the country turned to nine digits long: 9xx xxx xxx.

The following instructions are valid across the country:

Calls from mobile to mobile
     9xx xxx xxx (just dial the 9-digit number)

Calls from mobile to landline
     0 + area code + phone number
     Example on how to call to Piura: 0 + 73 + xxxxxx

Calls from fixed line to mobile
     9xx xxx xxx (just dial the 9-digit number)

Domestic calls within Peru

Calls from fixed line to landline
     Call to a number in the same area: just dial the phone number

     Call to a number in another area (domestic long distance):  0 + area code + phone number.

International long distance

Calling Peru from abroad

Calling a fixed line
     +51 + area code + phone number
Where the plus sign (+) represents the international access code of the country you are calling from.

From North America: 011 + 51 + area code + phone number

Example: 
 Calling a fixed line in Lima:  011 51  1  1234567
 Calling a fixed line in Cusco: 011 51  84  123456
 Calling a fixed line in Machu Picchu: 011 51  84  123456

From Europe or most APAC countries: 00 + 51 + area code + phone number

Calling a mobile number
In Peru, a cell-phone number starts with a 9.
     +51 9XX XXX XXX (9-digit mobile number)
The mobile virtual area eliminates the use of area code for mobile numbers.

Calling abroad from Peru
In Peru, when making an international call you may choose a carrier for international calls different from your usual carrier/provider according to the rates carriers offer to attract callers. This system is known as "call by call" (in Spanish "Llamada por llamada") as each call can be made with a different carrier and is available to both fixed lines and mobile phones. Each carrier uses a 4-digit prefix (format 19XX).

International dialing format
This is the standard format in Peru for making calls abroad from fixed lines and mobile phones:
     19XX + 00 + country code + area code + phone number

Carriers:
 Americatel: 1977
 Claro: 1912
 IDT: 1914
 Convergia: 1960
 Movistar: 1911
 Entel: 1990 (valid only for Entel customers)
 Bitel: 1968

It is mandatory to choose a 19XX carrier when calling internationally from a fixed line.

If you are calling internationally from a mobile phone you have the option not to use the 19XX prefix. You may dial starting with the "+" symbol
     +country code + area code + phone number
and the international call will go through your provider's network.

Example calls
From Peru to USA/Canada:
 From fixed line or mobile phone: 19XX + 00 + 1 + area code + phone number
 From mobile phone (2° alternative): +1 + area code + phone number (your call will go through your usual provider's network)

Special numbers
103 is the telephone information number
105 is the Police Emergency Number
117 is the Ambulance number
116 is the Fire number

References 

Peru
Telecommunications in Peru
Telephone numbers